Plug and Play Tech Center (or "Plug and Play")  is a global innovation platform founded by Saeed Amidi, aiming to connect early stage investors, startups, and the world’s largest corporations together. The firm’s headquarters is based in Sunnyvale, California, the center of Silicon Valley, and expanded globally with more than 40+ offices across more than 20 countries.

Plug and Play's primary objective is to successfully run corporate innovation programs and accelerator programs for startups, operating across 20+ industries worldwide. The company is essentially an ecosystem, which has notably brought together 35,000+ startups, 500+ world corporations, venture capital firms, universities, and government agencies in the past 16 years. Since it was founded in 2006, the firm has established a global network for startups and corporations, raising over $9 billion in funding by companies within the community.

Plug and Play was an early investor in Google, PayPal, Dropbox, LendingClub, N26, Soundhound, Honey, Kustomer, and Guardant Health. More of their success stories include: Danger, Dropbox, Lending Club, SoundHound, and Zoosk.

History 

Plug and Play’s history began in the 1990s with CEO and founder, Saeed Amidi. He and his family owned a conglomeration of businesses from bottled water to plastics and later a whole portfolio of commercial real estate properties. Their next business ventures led to a successful Persian rug business in downtown Palo Alto called the Medallion Rug Gallery. 

Following the early success of Medallion Rug Gallery, the Amidi Group purchased the property at 165 University Avenue in Palo Alto in 1988. The building quickly gained a reputation of its own through the success of its tenants, and became known as the origin of successful companies: Google,PayPal, Logitech, Milo (acquired by Ebay). All of which, once started in the shared space that was  nicknamed the “Lucky Building.”

Over the years, Rahim and Saeed Amidi realized the special position this building put them in as investors. They were able to meet some of the world’s most notable startups at an early stage, which led them to larger scale operations.

In 2006, Saeed Amidi and Rahim Amidi purchased their 180,000 square foot (~17,000 square meters) headquarter building from Phillips and officially began Plug and Play Tech Center: an early stage technology investor and startup incubator. The Amidi brothers officially founded Plug and Play Tech Center and are now publicly recognized as one of the most active investors in Silicon Valley,  having invested in over 1,600 startups and helped over 10,000 entrepreneurs around the world.

Overview 

Plug and Play partners with corporations, providing connectivity to the Silicon Valley startup culture and to accelerate startups themselves. The innovation-driven platform works as a bridge between Silicon Valley and 30+ locations around the world, evidently aimed to make corporate innovation and accelerator programs open to anyone, anywhere.

Plug and Play runs two tracks of accelerator programs every year across the world in over 20+ industries (known internally as ‘verticals’).

The accelerator programs runs twice per year in each industry and location (totaling 50 accelerator programs per year) and has over 500 corporate partners and 300 venture capitalists in its ecosystem. The goal of the accelerator is to honor innovative entrepreneurs, who are building the business of the future through sourcing them with the appropriate network of venture capitalists and corporate partners. The network in the Plug and Play ecosystem gives a leverage for portfolio companies to boost their businesses and stand out in the market. Among demonstrations of global growth, Plug and Play was recently named the 'Most Active Silicon Valley Venture Capital Firm' by Silicon Valley Business Journal.

Essentially, in the company's 2021 report, Plug and Play have over 1,600+ investments since 2006 and accelerated over 2,539 startups (616 in USA, 518 in EMEA, and 1,405 in Asia) and have made 210 investments in 2021. The company has raised an estimated $70.0M, and hit $580.8M in revenues.

Industries 
The industries (otherwise referred to as "verticals") that the company focuses on includes:

 Agtech
 Animal Health
 Brand & Retail
 Energy
 Enterprise Tech
 Financial Technologies (Fintech)
 Food & Beverage
 Health
 Insurance Technologies (Insurtech)
 Internet of Things
 Maritime
 Media & Advertising
 Mobility
 New Materials & Packaging
 Real Estate & Construction
 Smart Cities
 Supply Chain
 Sustainability
 Travel & Hospitality

Locations 
The company has offices in over 40+ locations including Sunnyvale, Berlin, Stuttgart, Paris, Munich, Frankfurt, Abu Dhabi, Amsterdam, Guadalajara, Beijing, Shanghai, Tokyo, Kyoto, São Paulo, Singapore, Valencia, Spain, Cleveland, and others.

Plug and Play announced the establishment of its first India centre at Hyderabad, Telangana, in December 2021. In the second half of 2022, Plug and Play Taiwan was established in Taipei.

References

Startup accelerators
Sunnyvale, California
Innovation
Silicon Valley
Venture capital